Silchar - Jiribam Passenger is a Passenger express train of the Indian Railways connecting Silchar in Assam and  Jiribam in Manipur. It is currently being operated with 55665/55666 train numbers on twice a day basis. This train is only trains service to Manipur.

Service

The 55665/Silchar - Jiribam Passenger has an average speed of 25 km/hr and covers 56 km in 2 hrs 15 mins. 55666/Jiribam - Silchar Passenger has an average speed of 25 km/hr and covers 56 km in 2 hrs 15 mins.

Route and halts

Traction

Both trains are hauled by a Siliguri Loco Shed based WDP-4 diesel locomotive.

Coach composite

The train consists of 7 coaches :

 6 General
 1 Second-class Luggage/parcel van

Direction Reversal

Train Reverses its direction 1 times:

Rake Maintenance 

The train is maintained by the Silchar Coaching Depot. The same rake is also use for Silchar - Bhairabi Passenger.

See also 

 Silchar railway station
 Jiribam railway station
 Silchar - Bhairabi Passenger

References

References 
 55665/Silchar - Jiribam Passenger
 55666/Jiribam - Silchar Passenger

Rail transport in Manipur
Rail transport in Assam
Slow and fast passenger trains in India
Railway services introduced in 2016
2016 establishments in Manipur
Transport in Silchar
2016 establishments in Assam